Please don't delete this article because this actor or actress will play a lead or supporting role in the tokusatsu series "Uchu Sentai Kyuranger"  and will continue their career and make more roles, either lead or supporting, after the end of the programme.

 is a Japanese singer and actor.

Biography
Kishi was born in Yokohama, Kanagawa Prefecture. In 2010, he participated in the LDH sponsored Vocal Battle Audition 2 and became a finalist but lost.

In 2011, he started his music career under the producer Tatsuro Mashiko, who is a composer.

In 2014, Kishi left LDH.

In 1 December 2016, he announced that he is represented with Yōdō from K-Dash.

In 2017, Kishi joined the cast of Uchu Sentai Kyuranger, playing Stinger / Sasori Orange. He also starred in the first personal spin-off in Super Sentai history. Besides being in the lead role, he also provided the theme, insert and ending song of the movie. He also graduated from Waseda University in March.

In February 2018, Kishi embarked on a live house tour across Japan and released a self-produced album, for you. He traveled between 15 cities, while appearing in stage shows for Kyuranger on weekends. In April, a mobile fan club site is launched. After officially graduating from Kyuranger in the summer movie Uchu Sentai Kyuranger vs Space Squad, he held a birthday live in Shibuya and announced his major debut in December. Kishi's first mini-album, titled Hashitai wake janai (走りたいわけじゃない)is released by Nippon Columbia on 5 December. An anniversary one-man live was held on 21 December and was live broadcast on niconico.

In 2019, Kishi kicked off the year with an event tour performing free live shows in malls to promote his debut album. Door, a digital single is released on 1 April. He also started hosting a weekly YouTube show Elementary Channel, interviewing fellow artists. Kishi again announced his second album THE ONEMEN'S on this year's birthday live. The lead single from the album, Gomen ne(ごめんね), is released digitally on 31 July and its MV on 29 August. Prior to the album release on 25 September, Kishi ran another event tour. THE ONEMEN'S as a concept spawned a fictional six-men idol group of the same name, all personified by Kishi alone. In October, Kishi hosts for Nippon Cultural Broadcasting a live radio show, Kishi Yosuke's Start-Up where he interviews up-comers from all sectors. Kishi is to star in the musical A Christmas Carol as young Scrooge at the end of the year. 

A live house tour titled 改めまして、岸洋佑と申します is scheduled for February and March 2020.

In 2021, Kishi formed a YouTube group towards Indonesian audience named SUKIYAKI LAKI-LAKI with Tetsuji Sakakibara, Keisuke Minami, Tsubasa Takayama and Ibul.

Discography

Mini albums

Singles

Participation works

Filmography

Stage

Television

Movies

References

External links
 

Japanese male pop singers
Living people
People from Yokohama
Waseda University alumni
1993 births

21st-century Japanese singers
21st-century Japanese male singers